Giovanna Masciotta (born 2 September 1942) is a retired Italian fencer. She competed in the individual and team foil events at the 1964 and 1968 Summer Olympics with the best result of fourth place in the team event in 1964. Her father Aldo Masciotta also was an Olympic fencer.

References

External links
 

1942 births
Living people
Italian female fencers
Olympic fencers of Italy
Fencers at the 1964 Summer Olympics
Fencers at the 1968 Summer Olympics
Sportspeople from the Metropolitan City of Turin
People from Lanzo Torinese